Thomas Albert Read (2 April 1900 – 1956) was an English professional footballer who played as a goalkeeper.

References

1900 births
1956 deaths
Sportspeople from West Bromwich
English footballers
Association football goalkeepers
West Cannock Colliery F.C. players
Darlaston Town F.C. players
Stockport County F.C. players
Grimsby Town F.C. players
Crystal Palace F.C. players
Shirley Town F.C. players
English Football League players